New Delhi Municipal Council (NDMC) is the municipal council of the city of New Delhi, Delhi, India. It covers an  area of 42.7 km2 under its administration, which is commonly referred as Lutyens' Delhi.

The only owner is Government of India and about 80% of buildings in New Delhi are owned by the New Delhi Municipal council area. It is governed by a council headed by a chairperson, who is usually a career civil servant and holds the rank of Joint Secretary to Government of India appointed by Government of India. The council also includes the Chief Minister of Delhi as an Ex officio member.

It is one of three local bodies in the National Capital Territory of Delhi, the others being Municipal Corporation of Delhi and Delhi Cantonment Board.

History
NDMC has its origins in the Imperial Delhi Committee which was constituted on 25 March 1913 to overlook the construction of the new capital of India. Thereafter in February 1916 the Chief Commissioner, Delhi, created the Raisina Municipal Committee, which was upgraded to a 2nd class Municipality under the Punjab Municipal Act on 7 April 1925. Then on 22 February 1927, the Committee passed a resolution adopting the name "New Delhi" giving it the name, "New Delhi Municipal Committee", approved by Chief Commissioner on 16 March 1927.  In May 1994, the NDMC Act 1994, replaced the Punjab Municipal Act 1911, and the Committee was renamed as the New Delhi Municipal Council.

NDMC's headquarters building, known as Palika Kendra, was built in 1984, and was the tallest building in the city at that time.

Departments
 
NDMC has  28  departments:-
Architecture Dept.
Audit Dept.	
Accounts Dept.	
Civil Engineering Dept.
Commercial Dept.	
Council Secretariat Dept.	
Fire Dept.	
Finance Dept.
Information Technology Dept.	
Horticulture Dept.	
Electricity Dept.	
Enforcement Dept.
Public Health Dept.	
Project Dept.	
General Admn.Dept.	
Security Dept.
Law Dept.
Enforcement (B.R) Dept.	
Estate I Dept.	
Estate II Dept.
Public Relations Dept.	
Municipal Housing.	
Personnel Dept.	
Vigilance Dept.
Welfare Dept.	
Education Dept.	
Medical Services Dept.	
Property Tax Dept.

External links

References

Local government in Delhi
Government agencies established in 1927
1927 establishments in India